The Iowa City Metropolitan Statistical Area, as defined by the United States Census Bureau, is an area consisting of two counties in Iowa anchored by the city of Iowa City.
The Metropolitan Statistical Area (MSA) had a population of 171,491 people in the 2017 US Census Bureau population estimate. growing 12.39% compared to 2010. 

The Iowa City Metropolitan Statistical Area (MSA) is also a part of a Combined Statistical Area (CSA) with the nearby Cedar Rapids Metropolitan Statistical Area (MSA). This CSA plus two additional counties are known as the Iowa City-Cedar Rapids (ICR) region and collectively have a population of nearly 500,000.

Counties
Johnson and Washington make up the Iowa City metropolitan area with Johnson County being the second fastest growing county in Iowa.

Communities
Places with more than 50,000 inhabitants
Iowa City (Principal city)
Places with 5,000 to 50,000 inhabitants
Coralville
North Liberty, at 20% fastest growing city in Johnson County (2010-2017)
Washington
Places with 1,000 to 5,000 inhabitants
Kalona
Lone Tree
Riverside
Solon
Tiffin
Wellman
West Branch (partial)
University Heights
Places with 500 to 1,000 inhabitants
Ainsworth
Brighton
Hills
Oxford
Shueyville
Swisher
Places with less than 500 inhabitants
Coppock (partial)
Crawfordsville
West Chester
Unincorporated places
Cosgrove
Elmira
Frytown
Joetown
Morse
Oasis
River Junction
Sharon Center
Sutliff
Windham

Demographics
As of the census of 2000, there were 131,676 people, 52,136 households, and 29,213 families residing within the MSA. The racial makeup of the MSA was 91.22% White, 2.49% African American, 0.27% Native American, 3.52% Asian, 0.04% Pacific Islander, 1.08% from other races, and 1.38% from two or more races. Hispanic or Latino of any race were 2.54% of the population.

2013 demographic estimates
As of the 2013 US Census Bureau population estimate there were 161,170 people, an increase of 2800 people or 1.8% compared to 2012, due to 2,059 births, 651 international migrants and 889 from domestic migration. This compares favorably to nearly two thirds of Iowa counties who have lost population over 2012–2013.

Socioeconomic data
The median income for a household in the MSA was $39,582, and the median income for a family was $52,874. Males had a median income of $32,936 versus $26,306 for females. The per capita income for the MSA was $20,221, as of the census of 2000.

See also
Iowa census statistical areas

References

External links
 Iowa City government- Official site

 
Geography of Johnson County, Iowa
Geography of Washington County, Iowa